Emilija Podrug (born December 20, 1979) is a Croatian female basketball player.

References

External links
Profile at fiba.com

1979 births
Living people
Basketball players from Split, Croatia
Croatian women's basketball players
Power forwards (basketball)
Mediterranean Games gold medalists for Croatia
Mediterranean Games medalists in basketball
Competitors at the 1997 Mediterranean Games
21st-century Croatian women